Etna Township is one of the 25 townships of Licking County, Ohio, United States. As of the 2010 census, the population was 16,373, 8,311 of whom lived in the unincorporated portions of the township.

Geography
Located in the southwestern corner of the county, it borders the following townships and city:
Pataskala - north
Harrison Township - northeast
Liberty Township, Fairfield County - southeast
Violet Township, Fairfield County - southwest
Truro Township, Franklin County - west
Jefferson Township, Franklin County - northwest corner

Part of the city of Reynoldsburg occupies the western end of Etna Township, part of the village of Kirkersville occupies the eastern end, and the unincorporated community of Etna lies in the central part of the township.

Name and history
Etna Township was established in 1833. It is the only Etna Township statewide.

Two Native American mounds, known as the "Etna Township Mounds", are located within the township. Etna Township is located entirely within the Refugee Tract.

Government
The township is governed by a three-member board of trustees, who are elected in November of odd-numbered years to a four-year term beginning on the following January 1. Two are elected in the year after the presidential election and one is elected in the year before it. There is also an elected township fiscal officer, who serves a four-year term beginning on April 1 of the year after the election, which is held in November of the year before the presidential election. Vacancies in the fiscal officership or on the board of trustees are filled by the remaining trustees.

References

External links

County website

Townships in Licking County, Ohio
1833 establishments in Ohio
Populated places established in 1833
Townships in Ohio